Max Huber (5 June 1919 – 16 November 1992) was an influential Swiss graphic designer.

Max Huber was born in Baar, Switzerland in 1919. He graduated from Kunstgewerbeschule in Zurich under the name Hans Williman. In his formative years, he met Werner Bischof, Josef Müller-Brockmann, Carlo Vivarelli and Hans Falk.

His career began in 1935 in Zurich, where he worked for an advertising agency and later with Emil Schultness at Conzett&Huber. He met Max Bill and Hans Neuburg.

With the beginning of World War II – in order to avoid being drafted in the Swiss army – he moved to Milan to join Studio Boggeri. When Italy entered the war in 1941, Huber was forced to move back to Switzerland, where he began a collaboration with Werner Bischof and Emil Schultness for the influential art magazine Du.

He joined the group Allianz, and in 1942, he exhibited his abstract work at the Kunsthaus Zurich with Max Bill, Leo Leuppi, Richard Lohse and Camille Graeser.

With the end of the war, he went back to Milan. The Italian publisher Einaudi appointed him to creative director for the publishing house.

The following years were marked by some of his most iconic and influential designs. With Albe Steiner, he worked for the VIII Triennale di Milano. A keen jazz fan, he designed a series of stunning records covers, music magazines and the set stage for a jazz festival. He met Louis Armstrong. In 1948, he designed the seminal poster for the Autodromo Nazionale di Monza Grand Prix and two years later the corporate identity for the supermarket chain La Rinascente. With Achille Castiglioni, he designed large-scale installations for RAI, Eni and Montecatini.

In 1954, he was awarded the prestigious Compasso d’oro. In 1958, he traveled to the US as a speaker to the First International Seminar on Typography (New York Art Directors Club). 

In 1965, the Nippon Design Committee organised an exhibition of his work at Matsuya Design Gallery in Tokyo. This trip was the beginning of the designer's close ties with Japan, that would culminate with him marrying the artist and illustrator Aoi Kono.

In his later years, he alternated between commercial commissions, personal visual experimentation and teaching graphic design at Scuola Umanitaria in Milan, at Scuola Politecnica di Design also in Milan and finally at CSIA (Centro Scolastico Industrie Artistiche) in Lugano.

He died in Mendrisio in 1992.

m.a.x.museo, a museum dedicated to his name and preserving his personal archive, opened in Chiasso in 2005.

References
 Max Huber | Progetti Grafici 1936_1981, Electa, CL 35-0704-1
 Lo Studio Boggeri | 1933-1981, Electa, CL 35-0686-X
 Max Huber, Phaidon Press,

External links
 http://www.eyemagazine.com/review.php?id=143&rid=685&set=753
 http://www.maxmuseo.ch/
 Biography on Max Huber at Iconofgraphics.com
 Max Huber by Museo Cantonale d’Arte Lugano 

1919 births
1992 deaths
People from Baar, Switzerland
Swiss graphic designers